The following is a timeline of the history of the city of Surabaya, Indonesia.

Prior to 19th century
 1037 – An inscription mentioned Airlangga having built dams on the Brantas River and developed the port of Hujung Galuh, which is located on or near present-day Surabaya.
 1275 – According to some accounts, Surabaya was founded by Kertanegara of Singhasari.
 31 May 1293 – Raden Wijaya and his Javanese army defeated Mongol soldiers in a battle, with the date celebrated as the city's anniversary.
 1614–1625 – Mataram conquest of Surabaya, which culminated in the surrender of the city to the Mataram Sultanate.
 1617 – The Dutch East India Company established a lodge in Surabaya.
 4–13 May 1677 – Dutch forces took the city during the Trunajaya rebellion.
 1717–1723 – Surabaya rebelled against the VOC.
 July 1741 – Chinese residents of the city were massacred during a wave of violence against ethnic Chinese following the 1740 Batavia massacre.
 1743 – A Dutch settlement was established in Surabaya.

19th century
 1808 – Governor-General Herman Willem Daendels established the Constructie Winkel - an arms factory that precedes modern-day Pindad - in Surabaya.
 22 March 1822 – The old building of the Church of the Birth of Our Lady, Surabaya was consecrated.
 1836 – The Soerabaijasch Advertentieblad, the first newspaper in Surabaya, began publication.
 1845 – Dutch authorities completed the construction of the Prins Hendrik Fort, meant to fortify the city.
 1871 – Surabaya's city walls were demolished to make way for the city's growth.
 1878 – The city's first railway, a  track connecting it to Pasuruan, was opened.
 1889–1891 – During this period, steam trams were introduced to Surabaya.
 1895
 The Prins Hendrik Fort was dismantled.
 Students from the Hoogere Burger School established Victoria, the first football club in the city.

20th century

1900s-1930s
 5 August 1900 – The present building of the Church of the Birth of Our Lady, Surabaya completed construction.
 1 April 1906 – Surabaya's city council was established, composed of 15 Europeans, 3 natives, and 3 Chinese/Arabs.
 1910 – Work began on the construction of a modern port at Tanjung Perak.
 1913 – The Nederlandsch-Indische Artsen School/NIAS (Surabaya Medical college) was founded.
 31 August 1916 – The Surabaya Zoo was first founded as the Soerabaiasche Planten-en Dierentuin.
 1917 – The Indies Social Democratic Association (ISDV) organized sailors and soldiers into "soviets" mimicking the Russian Revolution, though the movement was suppressed in the following years.
 1925 
 Vliegkamp Morokrembangan, a Dutch Air Base, was established.
 September–December – Extensive strikes in Surabaya's engineering companies, culminating with the banning of Surabaya's railway workers' union.
 18 June 1927 – The Soerabajasche Indonesische Voetbalbond (today Persebaya) was established.
 1930 – Surabaya's population was recorded to be 341,700.

1940s

 1942
 3 February – First Japanese air strike against the city.
 18 February – Dutch coastal defense ship HNLMS Soerabaja and submarine HNLMS K VII were sunk by Japanese bombers in Surabaya harbor.
 1 March – The Imperial Japanese Army—the 48th Division and part of the 156th Mixed Infantry Brigade—invaded East Java, with Surabaya as the primary objective. The Dutch surrender was signed before fighting occurred in the city.
 17 May 1944 – Operation Transom – American and British bombers raided Surabaya.
 1945
 19 September – The "Flag Incident" or "Yamato Hotel Incident": Indonesian nationalist youths tore off the blue portion of the Dutch flag flown by the Yamato Hotel, changing it to the Indonesian flag.
 3 October – Vice Admiral Shibata Yaichiro, the most senior Japanese commander in Surabaya, surrendered to allied representatives.
 30 October – British Indian Army officer Aubertin Walter Sothern Mallaby was killed in his car.
 10 November – British forces attacked the city supported by naval and aerial bombardment, in what is today commemorated in Indonesia as Heroes' Day.
 1 July 1949 – Jawa Pos began publication in Surabaya.

1950s-1990s
 10 November 1954 – The Airlangga University was established.
 10 November 1957 – The Sepuluh Nopember Institute of Technology was inaugurated by Sukarno.
 4 April 1960 – The Morokrembangan Aviation Base was reinaugurated as the Morokrembangan Naval Air Base.
 19 December 1964 – IKIP Surabaya (today State University of Surabaya) was established.
 16 October 1965 – Following the 30 September Movement, organized attacks began on the Indonesian Communist Party members and locations in Surabaya.
 26 August–6 September 1969 – The 7th Pekan Olahraga Nasional was held in Surabaya.
 1979 – Moehadji Widjaja was elected mayor.
 1984 – Poernomo Kasidi was elected mayor.
 1986 
 The first Tunjungan Plaza was opened.
 The Surabaya–Gempol Toll Road was opened. 
 16 June 1989 – The Surabaya Stock Exchange was established.
 24 August 1990 - SCTV, Indonesia's second private television network, began airing from Surabaya.
 1993 – The Surabaya–Gresik Toll Road began operations.
 1994 
 The Surabaya Stock Exchange began operations.
 Soenarto Soemoprawiro was elected mayor.

21st century

2000s
 2000 
Surabaya's population was recorded during the 2000 census to be 2,610,519. 
 19–30 June – The 15th Pekan Olahraga Nasional was held in Surabaya.
 10 November – The Al-Akbar Mosque was inaugurated.
 16 January 2002 – Sunarto Sumoprawiro was removed from his position and was replaced by his deputy, Bambang Dwi Hartono.
 27 June 2005 – First direct mayoral election for the city.
 10 June 2009 – The Suramadu Bridge, connecting Surabaya and the island of Madura, was opened.

2010s

 2010
 Surabaya's population was recorded during the 2010 census to be 2,765,487.
 6 August – The Gelora Bung Tomo Stadium was opened.
 28 September – Tri Rismaharini becomes mayor of Surabaya.
 2012
 Surabaya's population was recorded 3,110,187 by Municipality of Surabaya.
 2015
 Tri Rismaharini was reelected as mayor with a landslide victory.
 2018
 13–14 May – A series of suicide bombings attacking churches and a police station kills 28 people (including 13 attackers) and injures 57.
 20 December – President Joko Widodo inaugurates final segments of the Trans-Java Toll Road, fully connecting Jakarta and Surabaya.

References

Citations

Sources 

 
 
 
 

Years in Indonesia
Surabaya
History of Surabaya